Mercedes Arn-Horn (born October 31, 1993) is a Canadian musician, songwriter, director and actor. She is the lead singer, guitarist and keyboardist of Canadian rock band Courage My Love. She is also the lead singer and guitarist of Canadian rock band Softcult.

Early life
Mercedes Arn-Horn was born in Toronto.  One of her first influences was going to an Alice Cooper concert at the age of 11.

Courage My Love

Mercedes formed Courage My Love in 2009 with her twin sister Phoenix Arn-Horn (drums, vocals, keyboards) and David Blake-Dickson (bass). The band were signed to Warner Canada in early 2010 after being discovered at a Battle of The Bands competition in their home town of Kitchener, Ontario. Arn-Horn was 17 years old when she signed the deal. Brandon Lockwood replaced David Blake-Dickson on bass in 2012.

Courage My Love have released seven EPs and two full-length albums and have toured both in Canada and internationally with bands such as Simple Plan, As It Is and Halflives.

Softcult
Mercedes formed Softcult in 2020 with her twin sister Phoenix Arn-Horn (drums, vocals). They were signed to British label Easy Life Records in 2020.

Softcult released its debut EP, Year Of The Rat, through Easy Life Records in 2021. A follow-up EP, Year Of The Snake, was released through Easy Life Records in 2022.

Discography

With Courage My Love

Albums:
 Becoming (Full-Length) (2015)
 Synesthesia (2017)

EPs:
 For Now (2011)
 For Now (Acoustic Sessions) (2012)
 Becoming (EP) (2013)
 Spirit Animal (2014)
 Skin and Bone (2014)
 Spectra (2020)
 Teenagers (remixes) (2020)

With Softcult

EPs:
 Year of the Rat (2021)
 Year of the Snake (2022)
 See You in the Dark (2023)

Others

 "All The Things She Said" (cover) - Halflives feat. Mercedes From Courage My Love

Filmography

References

External links
 

Living people
1993 births
21st-century Canadian actresses
Canadian women guitarists
Canadian film actresses
Canadian television actresses
21st-century Canadian guitarists
21st-century Canadian women singers
21st-century women guitarists